Paul Michael (August 15, 1926 – July 8, 2011) was an American actor. He was a regular guest star on American television appearing in Kojak, Hill Street Blues, Alias and Frasier. He also played King Johnny Romano on Dark Shadows. He was also in movies such as Mask of the Red Death and the TV movie Where There's a Will. He was best known for his appearances on Broadway where he frequently played the title role in Zorba the Greek, Tevia in Fiddler on the Roof, and the barber in Man of La Mancha. He danced in Tovarich with Vivien Leigh on Broadway in 1963.

Personal life
Michael was born in Providence, Rhode Island. He began singing at a young age in school productions. He served as a sergeant in the Army in the South Pacific during World War II. After the war he went to college with the G.I. Bill receiving a B.A. in English literature from Brown University. He was married for 23 years to actress Marion Ross, his third wife. He is survived by his two sons Matt and Greg Michael.

Death
Michael died from heart failure on July 8, 2011, at his home in Woodland Hills, California at the age of 84.

Filmography

Film

Television

References

External links
 

1926 births
2011 deaths
Male actors from Rhode Island
American male film actors
American male television actors
Brown University alumni
Actors from Providence, Rhode Island